Robin Wonsley  (born 1991) is an American activist and politician of the Democratic Socialists of America who has been a member of the Minneapolis City Council from the 2nd Ward since 2021.

Early life and education
Wonsley was born in Chicago in 1991 and grew up on the South Side. She attended Carleton College as a Posse Foundation Scholar and graduated in 2013 with a B.A. in Women’s and Gender Studies. After graduation, she was awarded a Watson Fellowship that supported her travel to Canada, Australia, South Africa and Ireland, where she studied criminal justice policies and practices. She moved to Minneapolis in 2014 and became the program coordinator for the University of Minnesota Women's Center and a board member for Restorative Justice Community Action.

She completed a mini MBA in Nonprofit Management from St. Thomas University in 2015 and began a Ph.D. program at the University of Minnesota in 2018. During her Ph.D. program, she conducted research on housing and racial disparities, and completed her Ph.D in Gender, Women, and Sexuality Studies.

Career
After the 2015 killing of Jamar Clark by police officers in Minneapolis, she became politically active over the next several years, including in the Black Lives Matter movement and Fight for $15 organizing efforts to raise the minimum wage in the city. She joined the Twin Cities chapter of Democratic Socialists of America in March 2020. In the summer of 2020, she participated in the George Floyd protests. She also became an organizer in the defund the police movement, an effort to reallocate some community resources towards crime prevention services and programs.

Minneapolis City Council

In 2021, she became the first Black Democratic Socialist to win a seat on the Minneapolis City Council after she defeated 14 year incumbent Cam Gordon, a member of the Green Party of Minnesota. The election also became the first time Minneapolis elected a majority of people of color to the city council.

Wonsley represents the 2nd Ward, which includes the neighborhoods of Cedar-Riverside, Como, Cooper, Longfellow, Prospect Park, Seward, and the University District. After the election, she identified housing as a major issue for the ward, and rent control as one of her policy priorities. She also advocated for the development of policy to address encampments in Minneapolis and the needs of encampment residents and joined four other councilmembers in supporting the development of a rent control policy. In January 2022, she called for a stop to evictions from homeless encampments, and was joined at a protest against eviction at the Near North homeless encampment by councilmembers Elliot Payne, Jeremiah Ellison, Jason Chavez, and Aisha Chughtai.

Personal life
In 2017, she married her husband in Liberia. She resides in the Seward neighborhood of Minneapolis.

References

1991 births
21st-century African-American politicians
21st-century American politicians
21st-century American women politicians
African-American activists
African-American city council members in Minnesota
African-American women in politics
Carleton College alumni
Democratic Socialists of America politicians from Minnesota
Living people
Minneapolis City Council members
Politicians from Chicago
Women city councillors in Minnesota